De Bannelingen  is a 1911 Dutch silent drama film directed by Léon Boedels and Caroline van Dommelen.

Plot
In the 19th century a group of nihilists wants to improve the horrible conditions for prisoners in Russia.

Cast
Caroline van Dommelen	... 	Alexandra Iwanovna Medjanof
Cato Mertens-de Jaeger	... 	Warwara Bogodouchow
Louis van Dommelen		
Jef Mertens		
Oscar Tourniaire		
Jan van Dommelen		
Jan Buderman	
Anton Roemer		
Manus Hulsman		
Wim Grelinger		
Jopie Tourniaire		
Ansje van Dommelen-Kapper		
Kees Lageman		
Tilly Lus		
Piet Fuchs

External links 
 

1911 films
Dutch silent feature films
Dutch black-and-white films
1911 drama films
Films directed by Caroline van Dommelen
Dutch drama films
Silent drama films